The Montgomery is a  tall, 26-story skyscraper in Near North Side, Chicago, Illinois.  It was built  in 1972 as part of the Montgomery Ward Company Complex to serve as a corporate headquarters.  The architect was Minoru Yamasaki who also designed the World Trade Center at the same time.  In 2005–2006, it was converted to residential use.

References

Residential skyscrapers in Chicago
Residential condominiums in Chicago
Minoru Yamasaki buildings
1972 establishments in Illinois
Office buildings completed in 1972
Residential buildings completed in 2006